Vincenzo Volpe (December 14, 1855 – February 9, 1929) was an Italian painter. From 1874 to 1890, he painted mostly genre scenes. From 1891 to 1896, he concentrated on religious art, then returned to genre works and portraits.

Biography
He was born in Grottaminarda, Campania. His family moved to Naples when he was eight, and in 1871 he enrolled at the Accademia di Belle Arti there and studied with Domenico Morelli. In 1877 in Naples, he exhibited a painting titled A peaceful interruption; in 1883 in Milan he exhibited Orazione and  'Accordo difficile. He submitted four paintings the same year in Rome, including Canzone allegra, which depicts an old man squatting on a stool, playing guitar and singing to a bed-ridden convalescent girl.

In 1884 in Turin, he exhibited Nello studio; in 1887 in Venice: Una partita d'onore and Lezione di musica. At the 1891 Exposizione Triennale of the Brera Academy, he exhibited Una vecchia canzone. He also did restorative work; notably the frescoes at the Sanctuary of Montevergine near Mercogliano.

In 1900, he was invited to the Royal Palace to do a portrait of King Umberto I. Two years later, he became a Professor at the Accademia and held that position until his death in Naples in 1929. From 1915 to 1925, he served as the Accademia's President. One of his best-known pupils was Giulia Masucci Fava.

References

Further reading
Anselmo Tranfaglia, V.Volpe e la sua Arte Sacra a Montevergine, 1928.
Mattia Limoncelli, Commemorazione di V.Volpe, A.D’Orsi e V.Gemito, Naples, 1929.

External links

Arcadja Auctions: More works by Volpe
Biography of Vincenzo Volpe

1855 births
1929 deaths
19th-century Italian painters
Italian male painters
20th-century Italian painters
20th-century Italian male artists
Italian genre painters
Painters from Naples
People from the Province of Avellino
19th-century Italian male artists